Dame Margaret Olivia Hillier  (born 14 February 1969), known as Meg Hillier, is a British Labour and Co-operative politician who was elected as the Member of Parliament (MP) for Hackney South and Shoreditch at the 2005 general election, was a junior government minister (2007–10) and was succeeded by Caroline Flint as Shadow Secretary of State for Energy and Climate Change in the Labour Party October 2011 reshuffle. She has chaired the Public Accounts Committee since 2015.

Early life and career
Hillier was educated at Portsmouth High School, a private school for girls in Southsea, Hampshire, followed by St Hilda's College at the University of Oxford, where she read Philosophy, Politics and Economics. During her time there she was elected Librarian of the Oxford Union Society. 

Hillier worked as a journalist in regional press and social housing media and was elected as a Councillor in the London Borough of Islington in 1994, representing the Sussex ward and serving as the Mayor of Islington in 1998, before standing down from the Council in 2002. She was elected as a founding Member of the London Assembly for North East London at the first London Assembly election of 2000, serving on the Assembly until 2004, and was a board member of Transport for London until she was elected to Parliament.

Parliamentary career
In 2004, Hillier was selected as the Labour candidate to contest the Hackney South and Shoreditch constituency through an all-women shortlist, following the retirement of the Labour MP Brian Sedgemore. She was elected to the House of Commons at the 2005 general election.

During the election campaign, Sedgemore resigned from Labour and joined the Liberal Democrats in protest at the attack on Iraq. Hillier retained the safe seat with a majority of more than 10,000 votes. She made her maiden speech on 24 May 2005, noting there were more men in the House of Commons that day than there had ever been women MPs.

She served as member of the Northern Ireland Affairs Select Committee for a year until she was appointed Parliamentary Private Secretary to the Secretary of State for Communities and Local Government Ruth Kelly in 2006. In June 2007, she was appointed a Parliamentary Under-Secretary of State at the Home Office.

During maternity leave beginning in March 2009, her ministerial role was taken over by Shahid Malik. In March 2008, Hillier voted with the Government in favour of nationwide Post Office closures, including seven in Hackney, of which her constituency forms a part.

In December 2009, while promoting the unpopular National Identity Card scheme as Identity Minister in Liverpool, she admitted she had forgotten her own ID card, attributing the error to the demands of looking after her baby.

In June 2015, Hillier was elected Chairman of the Public Accounts Committee in succession to Margaret Hodge. She was, as a result, among the 100 most influential people in the NHS according to the Health Service Journal in 2016.  As chair, she has been critical of the Troubled Families programme, saying that the PAC's conclusions on the programme were "far more serious" than "a slap on the wrist" for ministers.

An ardent supporter of the Remain campaign during the 2016 EU referendum, Meg Hillier announced that she was "devastated" that the UK voted to leave the EU and that the decision was fuelled by "xenophobic undertones".

She supported Owen Smith in the failed attempt to replace Jeremy Corbyn in the 2016 Labour Party (UK) leadership election.

Hillier has served as Trustee of the War Memorials Trust since 2001.

She stood for election as Speaker of the House of Commons during the 2019 Speaker of the British House of Commons election. However, she was unsuccessful, securing 10 votes (or 1.8%) in the first round, and coming in 7th out of seven candidates.

Hillier was appointed Dame Commander of the Order of the British Empire (DBE) in the 2021 Birthday Honours for political and parliamentary service.

Personal life
Hillier married Joe Simpson in 1997; the couple have three children. She is a Roman Catholic.

References

External links
 Meg Hillier MP official website

 Debrett's People of Today

|-

1969 births
Living people
21st-century British women politicians
21st-century English people
21st-century English women
Alumni of St Hilda's College, Oxford
British Roman Catholics
Councillors in the London Borough of Islington
Dames Commander of the Order of the British Empire
Female members of the Parliament of the United Kingdom for English constituencies
Hackney Members of Parliament
Labour Co-operative MPs for English constituencies
Labour Members of the London Assembly
People educated at Portsmouth High School (Southsea)
People from Hampstead
UK MPs 2005–2010
UK MPs 2010–2015
UK MPs 2015–2017
UK MPs 2017–2019
UK MPs 2019–present
Women councillors in England